This is a list of seasons of HockeyAllsvenskan, including its predecessor, "Allsvenskan".  The name "Allsvenskan", meaning "All-Swedish", has been used unofficially since early in the history of ice hockey in Sweden, but first gained official use in 1983 as the name of a spring tournament for the best ranked teams from Division I, which at the time was the second tier of Swedish hockey.  Allsvenskan first became a stand-alone league for the 1999–2000 season, then divided into a northern and southern group.  During this period, the top teams from each group would break off after the Christmas break to play in a new group called SuperAllsvenskan.  Starting with the 2005–06 season, the two groups of 12 teams were merged into one group of 16 (later reduced to 14), and the league gained its current name, HockeyAllsvenskan.

List of Allsvenskan seasons

List of HockeyAllsvenskan seasons

External links

 Swedish Ice Hockey Association: Historical Statistics
 HockeyAllsvenskan website